USCS Robert J. Walker was a survey ship that served in the United States Coast Survey, a predecessor of the United States Coast and Geodetic Survey, from 1848 until sinking in 1860 after a collision at sea. Her loss resulted in the death of 20 men, the greatest loss of life in single incident ever to befall the National Oceanic and Atmospheric Administration or any of its ancestor agencies. It was added to the National Register of Historic Places on March 19, 2014.

Construction and acquisition

Robert J. Walker was a sidewheel steamer built in 1844 by Joseph Tomlinson at Pittsburgh, Pennsylvania, as one of the United States Governments first iron-hulled steamers. She was among eight steamers originally intended for the United States Revenue Cutter Service, but the Revenue Cutter Service had decided that the steamers were too expensive to maintain and operate, and she instead entered Coast Survey service in 1848.

Operational history
Robert J. Walkers first operations involved surveying the waters of Mobile Bay in 1848, and her first commanding officer, Carlile P. Patterson, reported that year on her performance and capabilities compared with those of sailing ships.

Robert J. Walker spent the 1850s charting the waters of the United States Gulf Coast. She suffered deaths among her crew in 1852 when two men—her second and third assistant engineers—died of disease during an epidemic along the Gulf Coast.

On the night of 20 January 1858, Robert J. Walker was at Pensacola, Florida, when a major fire broke out at the United States Armys Fort Pickens. Her men and boats, along with the hydrographic party of the Coast Survey steamer , promptly assisted in fighting the fire. The next day, Robert J. Walkers commanding officer received a communication from Captain John Newton of the Army Corps of Engineers, commanding the harbor of Pensacola, acknowledging the important firefighting service rendered by Robert J. Walker.

Loss
Early on the morning of 21 June 1860, Robert J. Walker had completed her most recent hydrographic survey work and was bound from Norfolk, Virginia, to New York City in rough seas with a crew of 72 and the wife of the executive officer on board. At 02:20, a commercial schooner, identified as Fanny by Robert J. Walkers crew, collided with her. She sank in less than 30 minutes in the Atlantic Ocean off the coast of New Jersey approximately 12 nautical miles (22 kilometers) southeast of Absecon Inlet Light, with a loss of 20 men. It was the greatest disaster ever to occur in any ancestor agency of the modern-day National Oceanic and Atmospheric Administration (NOAA). The commercial schooner R. G. Porter came to Robert J. Walkers assistance, recovered her survivors, searched for her missing men, and brought the survivors into May's Landing, New Jersey, later in the day. Fanny, meanwhile, arrived at Cape May, New Jersey, that day with damage consistent with a collision with Robert J. Walker.

With the American Civil War approaching, no inquiry into the cause of the Robert J. Walker disaster ever took place, and the Coast Survey did not pursue the matter of Fannys presumed culpability in the sinking. No official ceremony in honor of the lost crewmen was held.

Discovery of wreck
On 21 June 2013, the NOAA survey ship , operating in the area to conduct hydrographic surveys for navigation safety after Hurricane Sandy, held a wreath-tossing ceremony in the general area of the wreck to honor Robert J. Walkers dead on the 153rd anniversary of her sinking – the first official commemorative ceremony ever held for them – then collected survey data using multibeam sonar and sidescan sonar later in the day that established with 80 percent certainty the identity and location of the wreck. A NOAA Maritime Heritage dive team, also in the area for post-Hurricane Sandy operations, confirmed the wrecks identity on 23 June 2013. NOAA used several key clues to confirm the identity of the ship including the size and layout of the iron hull, unique engines, and rectangular portholes.

NOAA has no plans to raise the wreck, make it a sanctuary, or limit diving to it, but does plan to work with the New Jersey diving community to increase understanding of the wreck.

References

External links
 NOAA History, A Science Odyssey: Tools of the Trade: Ships: Coast and Geodetic Survey Ships: Robert J. Walker
 NOAA History, A Science Odyssey: Hall of Honor: In the Line of Duty 1846-1936
 NOAA History, A Science Odyssey: Hall of Honor: Lifesaving and Protection of Property by the Coast & Geodetic Survey 1845-1937

Ships of the United States Coast Survey
Survey ships of the United States
Ships built in Pittsburgh
Ships sunk in collisions
Shipwrecks of the New Jersey coast
Maritime incidents in June 1860
1844 ships
National Register of Historic Places in Atlantic County, New Jersey
Shipwrecks on the National Register of Historic Places in New Jersey